Caladenia longicauda subsp. rigidula, commonly known as the rigid white spider orchid or island white spider orchid, is a plant in the orchid family Orchidaceae and is endemic to the south-west of Western Australia. It has a single hairy leaf and up to three large, mainly white flowers with relatively short lateral sepals and petals. It is similar to the reclining white spider orchid (C. cruscula) but that species has smaller, cream-coloured flowers.

Description
Caladenia longicauda subsp. rigidula is a terrestrial, perennial, deciduous, herb with an underground tuber and which usually grows as solitary plants. Flowering occurs from August to early October. This subspecies is similar to Caladenia cruscula but has larger white flowers rather than creamy-yellow ones.

Taxonomy and naming
Caladenia longicauda was first formally described by John Lindley in 1840 and the description was published in A Sketch of the Vegetation of the Swan River Colony. In 2001 Stephen Hopper and Andrew Brown described eleven subspecies, including subspecies rigidula and the descriptions were published in Nuytsia. The subspecies name (rigidula) is the diminutive form of the Latin word meaning "stiff", "hard" or  "inflexible" hence "rather rigid", referring to the stiffly spreading sepals and petals of this subspecies.

Distribution and habitat
The rigid white spider orchid mainly occurs between Ravensthorpe and Israelite Bay in the Coolgardie, Esperance Plains and Mallee biogeographic regions where it grows in moist places including in shallow soil on granite outcrops.

Conservation
Caladenia longicauda subsp. rigidula  is classified as "not threatened" by the Western Australian Government Department of Parks and Wildlife.

References

longicauda subsp. rigidula
Endemic orchids of Australia
Orchids of Western Australia
Plants described in 2001
Taxa named by Stephen Hopper
Taxa named by Andrew Phillip Brown